Petar Muslim (born 26 March 1988) is a Croatian water polo player who is playing for the German club Waspo 98 Hannover since 2019. At the 2012 Summer Olympics, he competed for the Croatia men's national water polo team in the men's event where he won gold.

Honours

Club
Primorje Rijeka
 LEN Champions League runners-up: 2014–15
Croatian Championship: 2013–14, 2014–15
Adriatic League: 2012–13, 2013–14, 2014–15
Croatian Cup: 2011–12, 2012–13, 2013–14, 2014–15  
Mladost
Croatian Championship: 2007–08
Croatian Cup: 2009–10, 2010–11

See also
 Croatia men's Olympic water polo team records and statistics
 List of Olympic champions in men's water polo
 List of Olympic medalists in water polo (men)
 List of World Aquatics Championships medalists in water polo

References

External links
 

1988 births
Living people
Water polo players from Split, Croatia
Croatian male water polo players
Water polo drivers
Water polo players at the 2012 Summer Olympics
Medalists at the 2012 Summer Olympics
Olympic gold medalists for Croatia in water polo
World Aquatics Championships medalists in water polo
Competitors at the 2013 Mediterranean Games
Mediterranean Games medalists in water polo
Mediterranean Games gold medalists for Croatia
Expatriate water polo players
Croatian expatriate sportspeople in Germany
Croatian expatriate sportspeople in Italy